Salaam Memsaab is a 1979 Hindi-language comedy drama film directed by Asrani.

Story
Radha (Zarina Wahab) and Sunder (Asrani) and a child (Master Jeetu) are street singers who earn their living singing and dancing on streets, especially in the posh area near the Taj Mahal Intercontinental Hotel opposite of the Gateway of India in Bombay, India. Radha is pretty much down to earth and is content with living this life, working hard. But Sunder has big dreams of becoming rich, wealthy, and famous - quickly. Sunder's dreams do come true, albeit temporarily, when he wins an all-paid week's stay at a five star hotel, and comes in contact with the rich, the wealthy, and the famous.

Cast
Sunil Dutt as Naresh Sarit
Rishi Kapoor as Ramesh (Guest appearance)
Yogeeta Bali as Sunita Sarit
Zarina Wahab as Radha
Asrani as Sunder
Ranjeet as Gopal
Rehman as Mr. Mehra
Leela Mishra as Mausiji
Keshto Mukherjee as James
Tom Alter as John
Dalip Tahil as Arab Smuggler
C.S. Dubey   
Arvind Rathod

Soundtrack 
The music of the film was composed by R. D. Burman and lyrics were penned by Majrooh Sultanpuri.

References

External links
 

1979 films
1970s Hindi-language films
Films scored by R. D. Burman
Films directed by Kalpataru
Indian comedy-drama films